Hylje (799) is a combined pollution cleanup ship and vehicle transport ship built in 1981 and refitted in 1990–1991. She is operated by a civilian crew from the Ministry of the Environment, but is under Finnish Navy control. The vessel can act as a landing ship and logistic support vessel. The vessel has a capacity to carry 100 tons of deck cargo and its bow ramp can unload vehicles up to 42 tons. The vessel can be operated in light ice. Hylje is equipped with a 6-ton crane.

References 

Ships of the Finnish Navy
Ships built in Turku
1981 ships
Naval ships of Finland